The 1951 World Table Tennis Championships women's doubles was the 17th edition of the women's doubles championship.
The twin sisters Diane Rowe and Rosalind Rowe defeated Sári Szász and Angelica Rozeanu in the final by three sets to two.

Results

See also
List of World Table Tennis Championships medalists

References

-
1951 in women's table tennis